Zhejiang Chinese Medical University is a metro station on Line 4 and Line 6 of the Hangzhou Metro in China. It is located in the Binjiang District of Hangzhou and it serves the nearby Zhejiang Chinese Medical University. The station offers same direction cross-platform interchange between the two lines.

Gallery

References

Railway stations in Zhejiang
Railway stations in China opened in 2018
Hangzhou Metro stations